Micaela Ximénez de Frías Zayas Pizarro (1746 – 1815), was a Spanish courtier.  

She was the lady-in-waiting of the queen of Spain, Maria Luisa of Parma from 1769. She became an influential favorite and confidant of the queen. She is perhaps most known for having exposed Alejandro Malaspina's plot against the queen and Manuel Godoy in 1795.

References

1746 births
1815 deaths
Spanish ladies-in-waiting